Taylor v. United States, 579 U.S. ___ (2016), was a United States Supreme Court case in which the Court held that in a federal criminal prosecution under the Hobbs Act, the government is not required to prove an interstate commerce element beyond a reasonable doubt. The Court relied on the decision in Gonzales v. Raich which held that Congress has the authority to regulate the marijuana market given that even local activities can have a "substantial effect" on interstate commerce.

Background 
David Anthony Taylor performed two home-invasion robberies with the intent of stealing from two perceived marijuana dealers in Roanoke, Virginia. When initially tried in federal court, the jury deadlocked because of arguments that the marijuana in question was grown and intended for use within Virginia.  Taylor was then retried where the judge precluded that line of argument and convicted. The high court upheld that conviction.

Opinion of the Court 
Associate Justice Samuel Alito authored the majority opinion.

See also 
 Cannabis in Virginia

References

External links
 
 SCOTUSblog coverage

United States Constitution Article One case law
United States Supreme Court cases
United States Supreme Court cases of the Roberts Court
2016 in United States case law
Hobbs Act case law
United States Commerce Clause case law
United States controlled substances case law
Cannabis law in the United States
Roanoke, Virginia